Egba may refer to:

Egba people, a clan of the Yoruba people living in western Nigeria
EGBA, the European Gaming and Betting Association
Egba United Government, a late 19th century political entity of the Egba people that was located in what is today Nigeria

See also
 Egba Alake, one of the five sections of Egbaland